The 2005 Denmark Open in badminton was held in Aarhus, Denmark, from October 18 to October 23, 2005.

Venue
Aarhus Atletion, The Arena

Results

Men's singles

Others

External links
2005 Results

Denmark Open
Denmark Open
Denmark Open